Rajesh Ramanath is an Indian film score and soundtrack composer. He has scored music for Kannada films. He has also acted in a Kannada feature film Black & White (2003) as a lead actor.

Rajesh Ramanath debuted as a music composer in 1995 for the film Shubha Lagna and has composed for over 175 commercial and critically acclaimed feature films.

Some of Rajesh Ramanath's notable works are Annavra Makkalu (1996), Thavarina Thottilu (1996), Veerappa Nayaka (1999), Yajamana (2000), Huchha (2001), Swathi Muthu (2004), Aishwarya (2005), My Autograph (2006) among others. Rajesh ramanath nominated for Filmfare Best Music Director award for Vaalee And Huchcha.

Discography

References

External links
 

Living people
Musicians from Chennai
Kannada film score composers
Telugu film score composers
Year of birth missing (living people)